The Survivor is a British horror novel written by James Herbert and published by the New English Library in 1976. It is the third novel by Herbert, and the second not part of a wider series.  It was the basis of the 1981 movie of the same name, starring Robert Powell and Jenny Agutter. Herbert described the movie as "terrible ... absolute rubbish."

References 

1976 British novels
British horror novels
Novels by James Herbert
New English Library books